Hilda Rückert (8 April 1897 – 14 November 1960) was a German ice skater.

Early life 
Hildegard Charlotte Elisabeth Rückert was born in Charlottenburg, Berlin, the daughter of Fritz Karl Rückert and Luise Wilhelmine Karoline Schucht Rückert.

Career 
Rückert traveled to New York City in 1915 with a troupe of young women ice skaters, to join a show at the Hippodrome. As a solo performer, she starred in a rooftop show at the Golden Glades restaurant in New York, and made appearances on ice skates and rollerskates in Boston, Ottawa, Austin, Saranac Lake, Saratoga Springs, and other North American cities. She skated and practiced diving at Indianola Park in Columbus, Ohio.  In 1923, she competed as a speed skater at Lake Placid. In 1924, she and her sister Ofilia gave skating exhibitions at the National Ice Skating Championships in Endicott, New York. 

Rückert returned to Europe by 1928. She skated as a solo attraction at the St. Moritz Ice Rink for several years. She also skated in pairs with Paul Kreckow, and American skater Howard Nicholson. She appeared in a film, Der Springer von Pontresina (1934).

Personal life 
Rückert married Svend Zacho Lind, a Danish man, in 1930. She died in Nuremberg in 1960, aged 63 years.

References

External links 

 
 "Skating in Charlotte's Shadow: The Hilda Rückert story" Skate Guard (October 1920); a blog post about Rückert, with many images
 "Ice Skater Hilda Ruckert in Chamonix" (1930), photograph at Getty Images
 "Skating Trio" (1929), a photograph of Howard Nicholson, Hilda Rückert, and Paul Kreckow posing together on the ice at St. Morirz; at Getty Images
 Film clip of Hilda Rückert and Paul Kreckow ice dancing in St. Moritz, December 1928, in the Digital Collections of the University of South Carolina Libraries
 A British Pathé film clip of Rückert and Howard Nicholson skating in St. Moritz, 1929, on YouTube

1897 births
1961 deaths
German ice dancers
People from Charlottenburg